James Clayton Hill (born 10 January 2002) is an English professional footballer who plays as a central defender for Heart of Midlothian, on loan from AFC Bournemouth.

Early and personal life
His father is Matt Hill, also a footballer.

Club career

Fleetwood Town
Hill made his senior debut for Fleetwood Town in the EFL Cup, against Leicester City on 28 August 2018. Aged just 16 on his debut, Hill became the club's youngest ever first-team player. He turned professional in February 2019. He made his "impressive" league debut on 19 April 2019, against Peterborough United, with his long throw leading to Hunter's 95th minute equaliser for Fleetwood Town. Just three days later, on 22 April 2019, Hill made his first league start against his father's former club, Blackpool, which concluded in a 2–1 defeat for the side.

At the end of the 2020–21 season, Hill was offered a new contract at Fleetwood Town.

AFC Bournemouth
On 5 January 2022, Hill joined Championship club AFC Bournemouth for an undisclosed fee said to be a club record for Fleetwood and reported to be £1 million, signing a four-and-a-half year contract. He moved on loan to Heart of Midlothian in January 2023.

International career 
On 6 September 2021, Hill made his debut for the England U20s during a 6–1 victory over Romania U20s at St. George's Park.

On 10 June 2022, Hill made his England U21 debut during a 2023 UEFA European Under-21 Championship qualification 5–0 victory away to Kosovo.

Career statistics

References

2002 births
Living people
English footballers
Fleetwood Town F.C. players
AFC Bournemouth players
Heart of Midlothian F.C. players
English Football League players
Association football central defenders
England youth international footballers
England under-21 international footballers
Scottish Professional Football League players